3096 Days is a 2013 German drama film directed by Sherry Hormann. The film is based on the true story of Natascha Kampusch, a 10-year-old girl and her eight-year ordeal being kidnapped by Wolfgang Přiklopil. Northern Irish actress Antonia Campbell-Hughes portrays Kampusch, while Thure Lindhardt plays Přiklopil.

The film was writer Bernd Eichinger's last film before his sudden death, and Martin Moszkowicz, head of TV and Film at Constantin Film, and Ruth Toma (Gloomy Sunday) took over. It was also cinematographer Michael Ballhaus's final film.

Plot
In the morning of March 2, 1998, 10-year-old Natascha Kampusch walks to school alone after having an argument with her mother. On her way she is dragged into a van and wakes up in a cellar. Her captor is 35-year-old technician Wolfgang Přiklopil. Despite being erratic, odd and tyrannical with Natascha, in public Wolfgang is socially awkward and very lonely, with his only contact being his mother, who occasionally comes to visit and bring meals to him. Witness descriptions of the van lead police to interrogate Wolfgang, but do not find anything suspicious.

For the next four years Natascha is forbidden from leaving the cellar. Malnourishment, boredom, despair and Wolfgang's incessant psychological manipulation bring her down, giving up any intentions of escaping. Only when Natascha begins menstruating is she allowed to leave the cellar and shower, and from then on, she is allowed to be out more often. When Wolfgang's mother is pleasantly surprised to find a girl's hair on his sweater, he shaves Natascha to avoid raising further suspicion. On Christmas Day of 2003, Natascha is renamed Bibi by Wolfgang, who also reveals his name for the first time. Meanwhile, Natascha's mother is still guilt-ridden for having allowed Natascha to walk to school alone.

Wolfgang begins building a new bedroom and forces Natascha to do heavy work, half-naked, despite her physical condition. Natascha's abuse also becomes sexual, with Wolfgang handcuffing them both with cable tie every time he rapes her. Wolfgang explains that he did not pick Natascha at random, but rather became fascinated with her at a store and spent the following year building the cellar and planning her kidnapping.

Despite Natascha's obedience, her mistreatment intensifies. At one point she panics when Wolfgang pranks her to be left to die in a pit and punches him on the face. Still, Wolfgang has such sense of control over her that they go to a hardware store. Natascha hesitates to reach out to the storekeepers but is ultimately unable to after so much psychological manipulation.

Through a radio report Natascha learns that it has been 6 years since her kidnapping and gathers courage to escape. As such, she looks forward to Wolfgang's plans to go skiing. Being constantly monitored, her only chance is to go to the bathroom, but the only woman there is foreign and cannot understand her. Wolfgang notices this and beats her up at home. Natascha tries to commit suicide by lighting a fire in her cellar, but she cannot follow through. Noticing the smell, Wolfgang realizes what she has attempted and beats her up again. Fed up, she begins to write down every instance of mistreatment on toilet paper.

Soon after her 18th birthday, Wolfgang plans to sell his van and asks Natascha to vacuum it. While he attends a phone call, she escapes through the half-open gate entrance and asks a neighbour for help. Police reunite Natascha with her parents and inform that Wolfgang, knowing that he might be arrested at any moment has committed suicide by laying down on a railway.

Cast
Thure Lindhardt as Wolfgang Přiklopil
Antonia Campbell-Hughes as Natascha Kampusch
 Amelia Pidgeon as Young Natascha
Trine Dyrholm as Brigitta Sirny
Vlasto Peyitch as Journalist

Production
In late 2012, concerns arose about Campbell-Hughes' drastic weight loss for the film, but she stated in an interview in the Evening Standard that she wanted "to suffer as much as she — Kampusch — did". She also noted that she has received a torn Achilles tendon, a broken toe, a fractured rib, and various cuts and bruises, due to the film set being similar to the dungeon in which Kampusch was placed.

References

External links

German drama films
Drama films based on actual events
2013 drama films
Constantin Film films
2013 films
English-language German films
Films about child abduction
Films directed by Sherry Hormann
Films scored by Martin Todsharow
Films with screenplays by Bernd Eichinger
2010s English-language films
2010s German films